Ottolenghi is a toponymic surname of Jewish-Italian origin which was originally an Italianised form of Ettlingen. Notable people with the surname include:

Emanuele Ottolenghi, Italian political scientist
Giuseppe Ottolenghi, Italian politician and military leader
Les Ottolenghi, American casino executive
Yotam Ottolenghi (born 1968), Israeli-British chef, restaurant owner and food writer

See also
 Rodrigues Ottolengui (1861-1937), American writer